Khaooohs and Kon-Fus-Ion is the third and final album by avant-garde progressive death metal band Pan.Thy.Monium released in 1996.

Track listing

Personnel
Pan.Thy.Monium
Derelict - vocals 
Äag - lead guitars, organ and baritone saxophone
Mourning - rhythm guitars
Day DiSyraah - bass, keyboards and effects
Winter - drums, percussion and violin

Production
Matthew Jacobson - Executive producer
Bill Yurkiewicz - Executive producer
Paw Nielsen - Cover art
Dangerous Dave Shirk - Mastering
Day DiSyraah - Producer

External links
Encyclopaedia Metallum page

1996 albums
Pan.Thy.Monium albums
Albums produced by Dan Swanö